The Maimai languages constitute a branch of the Torricelli language family. They are spoken just to the west of Nuku town in eastern Sandaun Province, Papua New Guinea (including in Maimai Wanwan Rural LLG).

Languages
Maimai
Beli, Laeko-Libuat
Wiaki
Siliput, Yahang, Heyo

Pronouns
Pronouns in Maimai languages are:

{| 
|+ Maimai pronouns
!  !! Beli !! Siliput !! Yahang !! Heyo
|-
! 1s
| ki || oi || ai || ai
|-
! 2s
| si || yi || is || is
|-
! 3s
| ofo || tən || apan || apan
|-
! 1p
| əfə || yep || epep || apap
|-
! 2p
|  || yip || ipip || ipip
|-
! 3p
| afa || təmoŋ || apam || 
|}

Vocabulary comparison
The following basic vocabulary words are from Laycock (1968), as cited in the Trans-New Guinea database:

{| class="wikitable sortable"
! gloss !! Minidien !! Heyo !! Siliput !! Yahang !! Beli
|-
! head
| etwun || utüwe || paroŋ || wuntəf || 
|-
! ear
| nikiw || rakun || taŋən || raŋkun || ŋətə
|-
! eye
| napə || napelkə || oi || nampəl || satoʔ
|-
! nose
| mohau || luweka || luwet || ruwot || suwopən
|-
! tooth
| panikye || parkita || panəm || paniŋk || niŋo
|-
! tongue
| ləhe || elktife || yansɨ || elaŋkitif || life
|-
! leg
| etiyə || itikya || tiŋ || youpep || papaŋ
|-
! louse
| lumum || hipəp ||  || yaflin || 
|-
! dog
| panə || mpat || pat || mpat || pato
|-
! bird
| pelhin || walfisa || hilít || felfis || walfun
|-
! egg
| waltiye || laʔwo || yilhəf || lawo || lawiyen
|-
! blood
| amkeʔ || wiyefa || wuji || wiyef || kuijwẽ
|-
! bone
| loki || yefa || lokɨ || yefa || loknwẽ
|-
! skin
| kirkeʔ || halipa || purko || halip || noʔoŋ
|-
! breast
| mapi || maka || mayr || may || mapi
|-
! tree
| lowɨ || lowə || lou || lou || lowo
|-
! man
| məsən || mohon || matan || mukun || masən
|-
! woman
| nuka- pyene || nuweteʔ || yukətet || nuwot || sakwoto
|-
! sun
| amwo || fala || olok || fala || watli
|-
! moon
| auniye || onifəʔ || aune || kwonif || waluko
|-
! water
| supɨ || hipelə || sifyer || himpel || ite
|-
! fire
| yakel || yafa || ya || yaʔaf || safi
|-
! stone
| alpɨl; kitampa || paleka || wotə || wətə́f || kalkopo
|-
! two
| yatowiye || oloʔw || wuríkrŋ || kolou || wosoŋ
|}

References

 

 
Torricelli Range languages
Languages of Sandaun Province